Glassland is a 2014 Irish drama film written and directed by Gerard Barrett in his second feature following Pilgrim Hill. The film stars Jack Reynor as a young man who tries to help his mother (Toni Collette) with her alcoholism.

Plot

John is a cash-strapped taxi driver in Dublin, who lives with his mother, Jean, who is drinking herself to death. He finds her comatose in her own vomit and drives her to the hospital where she recuperates until her next bout of drunkenness. John spends his time trying to get more work driving, hanging out with his one mate, arguing with his mother about alcohol, taxiing prostitutes, and palling with his younger brother, who has Down syndrome and lives in a home with other disabled kids. John rids his house of alcohol and tries to convince his mother to stop drinking but she screams at him and smashes the plates as he impassively videos her rampage.

After searching the town for his mother, who he fears for, he finds her drunk on the doorstep. Not knowing what else to do with her, he invites her to party with him and watches emotionless as she drinks and dances in the kitchen. She confides in him that when John's younger brother was born disabled, the father left, and she always saw the child as less than human, and nothing but a drain on her. But she says that John was her precious child, who always came looking for her. After the father left, she felt destined to be utterly alone the rest of her life, until she found alcohol.

John convinces her to enter a treatment centre, by screaming at her that she is breaking his heart and that he can't take it any more. He shows her the video of her raging for alcohol. The free centre can only keep her for one week, but the concerned director finds a place at a private clinic with a fee of 8,000 euros. Desperate, John calls his boss to ask for an advance, agreeing to do his bidding. John drives his mate to the airport to leave the country, but on the way has arranged for him to have cathartic meeting with his young son that he almost never gets to see. Then John and his mate say a tearful goodbye at the airport.

John visits his mother at the new centre, along with his brother, and the mother makes an emotional connection with him. John's boss tells him to pick up something delicate for him. He drives to a desolate house where he finds a young Asian woman, abused and delirious in a bathtub. Disturbed and perplexed, he ends up driving her to the director of the treatment centre to get her help.

Cast
 Jack Reynor as John
 Toni Collette as Jean
 Will Poulter as Shane
 Michael Smiley as Jim
 Darine Ní Dhonnchadha as Bridie
 Gary Ó'Nualláin as Frank

Release
Glassland was released theatrically in Ireland and the United Kingdom on 17 April 2015.

References

External links
 

2014 films
2014 drama films
Irish drama films
English-language Irish films
Films set in Ireland
Films shot in Ireland
Films directed by Gerard Barrett
2010s English-language films